The Apple S2 is the integrated computer in the Apple Watch Series 2, and it is described as a "System in Package" (SiP) by Apple Inc.
It was revealed on September 7, 2016, with very little info about specifications. Apple says its two cores deliver 50% higher performance and the GPU delivers twice as much as the predecessor, the Apple S1. The S1P SiP shipped in the Apple Watch Series 1 is a stripped down version of the S2 that lacks the GPS functionality, it is otherwise identical.

System-in-Package design
It uses a customized application processor that together with 512 MB memory, 8 GB storage and support processors for wireless connectivity, GPS, sensors and I/O constitute a complete computer in a single package. This package is filled with resin for durability.

Components
The device integrates discrete components like Wi-Fi, Bluetooth, GPS, NFC, touch controller, accelerometers, barometric sensor and RAM. In total, there are 42 individual silicon dies integrated into the single S2 component.

Images

See also 
 Apple silicon, the range of ARM-based processors designed by Apple.
 Apple Watch

References 

Apple silicon